Omosarotes nigripennis is a species of beetle in the family Cerambycidae. It was described by Zajciw in 1970. It is known from Brazil.

References

Cyrtinini
Beetles described in 1970